Caladenia armata is a plant in the orchid family Orchidaceae and is endemic to the Australian Capital Territory. It has a single dull green leaf with purple blotches near the base, and a single cream-coloured to pink flower with red to maroon markings. It is only known from a single population containing fewer than ten plants.

Description
Caladenia armata is a terrestrial, perennial, deciduous, herb with an underground tuber and which grows in small groups. It has a single dull green leaf with purple blotches near the base. The flower is cream-coloured to pink, with red lines. The lateral sepals are a similar to the dorsal sepal but almost twice as wide. The labellum curves forward and there are five to twelve pairs of linear, dark purplish-red teeth on its sides. Flowering occurs in October.

Taxonomy and naming
Caladenia armata was first formally described in 2006 by David L. Jones who gave it the name Arachnorchis armata and published the description in Australian Orchid Research from a specimen collected on the Majura Field Firing Range. In 2010, Gary Backhouse changed the name to Caladenia armata. The specific epithet (armata) is a Latin word meaning "furnish[ed] with weapons", referring to the type location.

Distribution and habitat
This spider orchid is only known from ten individual plants growing in the Majura Field Firing Range in open forest of red stringbark (Eucalyptus macrorhyncha) and white gum (Eucalyptus rossii.

References

armata
Plants described in 2006
Endemic orchids of Australia
Orchids of the Australian Capital Territory
Taxa named by David L. Jones (botanist)